John M. Olson (September 18, 1929 – July 2, 2017) was an American biophysicist and pioneer researcher in photosynthesis, especially light harvesting complex of green sulfur bacteria.

In 1962 Olson was the first to discover and characterize pigment-protein complex of green sulfur bacteria (Chlorobiota), which was later named after him as Fenna–Matthews–Olson complex. In 1980s he intensively studied bacteriochlorophyll self-assembly in chlorosomes of green sulfur and green non-sulfur bacteria.

References

Further reading
 

1929 births
2017 deaths
20th-century American scientists
Researchers of photosynthesis
Knights of the Order of the Dannebrog